Cold Steel... for an Iron Age is the third studio album by Australian extreme metal band Deströyer 666, released on June 2002. The album's artwork was never approved by the band; Season of Mist thought the original artwork was "too power metal", so the band was rushed to produce a new cover.

In 2018, Loudwire  named Cold Steel... for an Iron Age the best blackened thrash metal album in its "best metal albums from 40 subgenres" list.

Track listing

References 

Deströyer 666 albums
2002 albums
Season of Mist albums